An angvastra (plural, angavastram) is a shoulder cloth or stole worn by men in  India, especially in Maharashtra and South India. It is a single, rectangular piece of fabric and may have decorated borders. An angvastra may be worn with a dhoti and kurta. An angvastra may be offered as a mark of respect to guests, elders and gurus.

Style and use 
Angvastra is a simple loose garment, usually paired or matching with dhoti color, draped over the shoulders. It is a traditional wear of South India and a profound fashion statement.

Prime Minister Narendra Modi wore karai veshti dhoti, kurta, and angavastram, the traditional attire during his visit to Arjuna's Penance, Krishna's Butterball, the Pancha Rathas, and Shore Temple. A weaver from Varanasi designed and wove a special silk angavastram incorporating Buddhist mantras for Mr. Modi.

References 

Hindu religious clothing
Indian clothing
Indian clothing by state or union territory